Wallace and Gromit's World of Invention is a British science-themed miniseries, starring Peter Sallis, Ashley Jensen, Jem Stansfield, and John Sparkes, produced by Aardman Animations, which aired on BBC One during 2010, from 3 November to 8 December. The programme focuses on inventions based around various themes, and consists of live-action films interlaced with animated claymation segments hosted by characters Wallace and Gromit, featuring a side-plot connected to that episode's theme. While Sallis reprises his role as the voice of Wallace, live-action film segments were either narrated by Jensen or presented by Stansfield, with Sparkes providing the voice of Wallace and Gromit's unseen archivist Goronwy, a unique character for the programme.

The programme ran for six episodes and was the last production that Sallis performed in before his retirement from acting due to ill health. Its creation was aimed by the BBC at inspiring a new generation of inventors, according to a press statement released prior to the programme's broadcast.

Production
The series was commissioned by Jay Hunt, controller of BBC One, and Jo Ball, following a meeting to discuss the concept of the programme, with Alison Kirkham from the BBC and Miles Bullough from Aardman as the executive producers. The show's concept was to take a look at real-life inventors, contraptions, gadgets and inventions, from an educational point of view, but interlaced with the light-hearted humour associated with Wallace and Gromit.

Format
Each episode is focused on a specific theme that underlines the various inventions explored by the programme, as well as the side-plot of the animated escapades of Wallace and Gromit - while the former acts as host, the latter mainly tries to focus on running the film equipment the pair uses in the basement of their home. The side-plots often focus on an invention that Wallace has created to improve the pair's lives, inspired by the topical theme of the episode. Often the invention backfires due to bad construction or a mishap. Most of the programme consists of live-action segments. Most of these are narrated by Ashley Jensen, and focus on a novel invention and/or a modern inventor, with the exception of a recurring segment entitled "It Never Got Off the Drawing Board", which is presented by Jem Stansfield (referred to as Wallace's "science correspondent") and focuses on an invention that never got past the design or prototype stage. In a segment entitled "Contraption Countdown" and narrated by Wallace's archivist Goronwy (voiced by John Sparkes), the show features a countdown of five or six inventions documented in archive footage, connected to the episode's theme.

Episodes

Home release
On 13 December 2010, a DVD of the entire series was released, which also included a pamphlet of ideas for inventions and six short video demonstrations. A Blu-ray release had followed on 13 March 2012 in America by Lionsgate Home Entertainment.

References

External links
Official Wallace and Gromit website

Wallace and Gromit
2010s British children's television series
2010 British television series debuts
2010 British television series endings
BAFTA winners (television series)
British children's animated science fiction television series
British stop-motion animated television series
English-language television shows
BBC Television shows
Television series by Aardman Animations
Science and technology in the United Kingdom
Television shows set in Lancashire
British television series with live action and animation